Colonel Clement Biddle (May 10, 1740 – July 14, 1814) was an American Revolutionary War soldier.

Life 
Biddle was born May 10, 1740, in Philadelphia, Pennsylvania, to John Biddle (1707–1789) and Sarah Owen (1711–1773). He was the younger brother of Owen Biddle, Sr. (1737–1799). His great-grandson was Algernon Sydney Biddle.

Biddle was a part of the Society of Friends and helped organize the "Quaker Blues," a company of volunteers.

Biddle's first marriage was to Mary Richardson on June 6, 1764. They had one child, Francis, who died at childbirth. His second marriage was to Rebekah Cornell, the daughter of Rhode Island Chief Justice Gideon Cornell. They had four children: Frances (died at infancy), Thomas (born June 4, 1776), George Washington (February 21, 1779 – 1812), and Mary (born January 12, 1781).

He was elected to the American Philosophical Society in 1766.

During the American Revolutionary War, Biddle fought in the Battle of Princeton, the Battle of Brandywine, the Battle of Germantown and the Battle of Monmouth. He was the Commissary General at Valley Forge under George Washington, and his headquarters was at Moore Hall. Biddle resigned from the Army in 1780. In 1781, Biddle was made quarter-master general of the Pennsylvanian troops.

After the Revolutionary War, he was the first U.S. Marshal (1789–1793) for Pennsylvania.

In the 1790 census, Biddle's jobs were "Notary, Scrivener, and Broker," which made him a rich man.

Death
He died in Philadelphia on July 14, 1814, and is buried at Christ Church in Philadelphia.

See also 
 Biddle family

References

External links 
Papers of the War Department: Clement Biddle
 

1740 births
1814 deaths
Military personnel from Philadelphia
People of Pennsylvania in the American Revolution
People of colonial Pennsylvania
Continental Army staff officers
Military history of the United States
Quartermasters
Clement
United States Marshals
Burials at Christ Church, Philadelphia